Atreyee may refer to any of the following:
 Atreyee river
 Atreyee D. A. V. Public School (formerly "The Atreyee English Medium School), Balurghat, India
 Atreyee B. Ed college, Balurghat